Pirate Islands is an Australian children's television series conceived for Network Ten by Jonathan M. Shiff and Greg Millin. The series is produced by the Film Finance Corporation Australia, Jonathan M. Shiff Productions, Tele Images International, Network Ten Australia and Film Victoria.

Episodes

External links 
 

Pirate Islands